Thomas Mathew Szapucki (born June 12, 1996) is an American professional baseball pitcher for the San Francisco Giants of Major League Baseball (MLB).  He was selected by the New York Mets in the fifth round of the 2015 Major League Baseball draft, and made his MLB debut with them in 2021.

Career

Amateur career
Szapucki attended William T. Dwyer High School in Palm Beach Gardens, Florida. He was selected by the New York Mets in the fifth round of the 2015 Major League Baseball draft. He signed with the Mets for a signing bonus of $375,000, forgoing his commitment to the University of Florida.

Professional career

New York Mets
Szapucki made his professional debut in 2015 with the Gulf Coast Mets. He started 2016 with the Kingsport Mets, and was promoted to the Brooklyn Cyclones during the season. Szapucki finished 2016 with a combined 4-3 record and 1.38 ERA in 52 total innings pitched, with a 0.885 WHIP and 14.9	strikeouts per 9 innings, between the two teams. He was named a Baseball America Rookie All-Star.

He spent 2017 with the Columbia Fireflies, posting a 1-2 record, 2.79 ERA, and a 1.17 WHIP over 29 innings before undergoing Tommy John surgery in July, thus ending his season.

MLB.com ranked Szapucki as New York's fifth-ranked prospect going into the 2018 season. He missed all of 2018 due to undergoing Tommy John surgery. 

He returned to play in 2019 with Columbia, before being promoted to the St. Lucie Mets in July, and to the Binghamton Rumble Ponies in August. Over 21 games (18 starts) between the three clubs, he went 1-3 with a 2.63 ERA, striking out 72 over  innings, with a 1.216 WHIP and 10.5 strikeouts per 9 innings.

Szapucki was added to the Mets 40–man roster following the 2019 season. He did not play a minor league game in 2020 due to the cancellation of the minor league season caused by the COVID-19 pandemic.

On May 27, 2021, Szapucki was promoted to the major leagues for the first time, but was optioned down to the Triple-A Syracuse Mets the next day without making an appearance. He was recalled to the active roster and promoted to the majors a second time on June 29. He made his MLB debut the next day, pitching in relief against the Atlanta Braves, but allowed six runs in four and two-thirds innings. He was optioned back to Syracuse two days later. On July 13, it was announced that Szapucki would require ulnar nerve transposition surgery, ending his rookie campaign at one appearance.

Szapucki was again promoted to the active roster on May 25, 2022, starting against the San Francisco Giants on that day. He pitched one and one-third innings, allowing nine earned runs, in his only appearance with the Mets for the season. With AAA Syracuse in 2022, he was 2-6 with a 3.38 ERA in 18 games (16 starts), in which he pitched 64 innings and struck out 87 batters.

San Francisco Giants
On August 2, 2022, Szapucki, Carson Seymour, Nick Zwack, and J. D. Davis were traded to the San Francisco Giants for Darin Ruf. 

In 2022 with AAA Sacramento he was 0-0 with a 1.08 ERA in 8.1 innings in which he struck out 15 batters. In 2022 with the Giants he was 0-0 with a 1.98 ERA in 13.2 innings in which he struck out 16 batters.

References

External links

1996 births
Living people
Sportspeople from Toms River, New Jersey
Baseball players from New Jersey
Major League Baseball pitchers
New York Mets players
San Francisco Giants players
Gulf Coast Mets players
Brooklyn Cyclones players
Kingsport Mets players
Columbia Fireflies players
Binghamton Rumble Ponies players
St. Lucie Mets players
Syracuse Mets players